Jishan is a county in the southwest of Shanxi province, China. It is under the administration of Yuncheng city.

Climate

References

External links
www.xzqh.org 

 
County-level divisions of Shanxi